This is a list of public art and memorials in Edinburgh, including statues and other sculptures.

Calton Hill

Colinton

Corstorphine

Craigentinny

Craigmillar

Cramond

Inverleith

Leith

New Town

Niddrie

Old Town

Portobello

Princes Street

Riccarton

South Gyle

Southside

Stockbridge

Trinity

West End

Scottish National Gallery of Modern Art

References

External links
 
 

Edinburgh
Public art
Public art
Outdoor sculptures in Scotland
Public art in Edinburgh
Arts in Edinburgh